Pelšs (feminine: Pelša) is a Latvian topographic surname. Individuals with the surname include:
Kristiāns Pelšs (1992–2013), Latvian ice hockey player;
Valdis Pelšs (born 1967), Soviet and Russian television presenter of Latvian descent 

Latvian toponymic surnames
Latvian-language masculine surnames